Bourgoin-Jallieu is a commune in the Isère department in the region of Auvergne-Rhône-Alpes in France. The city had 28,834 inhabitants in 2019 and lies 35 kilometres east-southeast of Lyon. It was formed by the merger of the former communes Bourgoin and Jallieu in 1965.

Geography
Bourgoin is located 32 km from Lyon, 17 km from St Priest, the first suburb and 70 km from Grenoble. The town is next to the new town of l'Isle-d'Abeau and Saint-Exupéry International Airport.

The Bourbre flows northwest through the commune and crosses the town.

Neighbourhoods in the municipality include:
 Champfleuri
 Funas
 Champaret
 Boussieu
 La Grive
 Montbernier
 Planbourgoin
 Pré-Bénit
 Mozas
 l'Oiselet

Population
Bourgoin-Jallieu has a population of about 28,000. The population data given in the table and graph below for 1962 and earlier refer to the former commune of Bourgoin. A small town of about 3,500 inhabitants around 1800 and 7,000 around 1900, its population has rapidly increased since the 1960s. Its inhabitants are called Berjalliens.

Personalities
 Jean-Pierre Andrevon, science fiction author
 Brahim Asloum, world boxing champion and Olympic gold medallist
 Julien Bonnaire, rugby union player
 Frédéric Dard, writer
 Marc Cécillon, French rugby union player
 Simon Gachet, racing driver
 Claudie Gallay, writer
 Yvon Gattaz, businessman
 Amine Gouiri, footballer
 Seyhan Kurt, poet, writer
 Stéphane Glas, rugby union player
 Kévin Monnet-Paquet, footballer
 Marcelle Pardé, resistance member
 Guy Savoy, chef

Sport
Bourgoin-Jallieu is home to the professional rugby union club CS Bourgoin-Jallieu, which competes in the Second Division French national championship.

FC Bourgoin-Jallieu (fr) is the local association football team.

Both the football and the rugby clubs play at the Stade Pierre Rajon.

The 19th stage of the 2009 Tour de France ran through the town.

International relations

Bourgoin-Jallieu is twinned with:

 Bergisch Gladbach, Germany
 Conselice, Italy
 Dunstable, England, United Kingdom
 Rehau, Germany
 Velsen, Netherlands
 Wujiang (Suzhou), China

Culture

Gastronomy

Besides from being located in a region benefiting from the prestige of Lyon's gastronomy, Bourgoin-Jallieu is also the birthplace of chef Guy Savoy. Some of the most famous dishes of the city are the following:
  
 brioche de Bourgoin 
 Isernoix 
 San-Antonio chocolate 
 Grande Dauphine 
 Galet du Bion
 La Grise de Bazas

Literature
Bourgoin-Jallieu is the birthplace of Frédéric Dard, writer of the San-Antonio book series.

See also
 CS Bourgoin-Jallieu

References

External links

 

Communes of Isère
Dauphiné